John IV. of Bavaria-Munich (German: Johann IV., Herzog von Bayern), (4 October 1437, in Munich – 18 November 1463, in Munich) was duke of Bavaria-Munich from 1460 until his death.

Biography
John IV was a son of Albert III, Duke of Bavaria and ruled as duke of Bavaria-Munich from 1460 in a time of constant unrest of the nobility and strife with the cities. He was known as an avid hunter. He died of plague in 1463, and was succeeded by his brothers Sigismund (already co-regent since 1460) and Albert IV. John IV and his father are buried in Andechs Abbey.

Ancestors

1437 births
1463 deaths
15th-century dukes of Bavaria
House of Wittelsbach
15th-century deaths from plague (disease)
Burials at Andechs Abbey